The 1939-40 season was Associazione Sportiva Ambrosiana-Inter's 31st in existence and 24th consecutive season in the top flight of Italian football.

Summary 
The club  clinched the title, fifth in its history, and third as Ambrosiana, in Coppa Italia lost against Torino, in Mitropa Cup the squad is defeated by Újpest and its manager Bella Guttmann. Injured on the left foot Meazza stood in bench almost the entire season. The nerazzurri on the top of the table with Tony Cargnelli as manager, defeating Bologna in the final round and enjoyed the title in San Siro, field of rival Milan, due to attendance was bigger than Arena Civica.

Squad 

II

Competitions

Serie A

League table

Matches

Coppa Italia

Round of 32

Statistics

Squad statistics

Players statistics

Appearances

7.Giorgio Barsanti 
1.Celso Battaia 
12.Carmelo Buonocore 
7.Angelo Caimo 
31.Aldo Campatelli
23.Enrico Candiani
1.Antonio Caracciolo 
30.Attilio Demaría 
8.Giovanni Ferrari 
29.Pietro FerrarisII 
27.Annibale Frossi 
23.Umberto Guarnieri
30.Ugo Locatelli
4.Ezio Meneghello
24.Renato Olmi 
24.Giuseppe Peruchetti 
18.Bernardo Poli 
6.Víctor Pozzo 
3.Pietro RebuzziI 
2.Vittorio Rovelli 
27.Duilio Setti

Goalscorers
2.Giorgio Barsanti 
2.Aldo Campatelli 
8.Enrico Candiani 
12.Attilio Demaría 
7.Pietro Ferraris II 
7.Annibale Frossi 
16.Umberto Guarnieri 
1.Ugo Locatelli 
1.Pietro Rebuzzi I

References

Bibliography 

.

External links 

Inter Milan seasons
Internazionale Milano
Italian football championship-winning seasons